Elathagiri or Eluthagiri is a small village located in Krishnagiri district in the state of Tamil Nadu, India. This village is located 3 km away from Bangalore - Chennai Highway also 9 km away from the Krishnagiri Districts's capital, also called Krishnagiri. In this village there are many Catholic Christian settlements so Catholic missionaries started schools here more than 100 years ago. This village is quite famous around the surrounding areas because of its Churchs, Schools and Colleges.

Education

 St. Antony's Primary School
 St. Antony's Higher Secondary School 
 Gonzaga Matric Higher Secondary School
 Government Higher Secondary School, Orappam (4 KMS from Elathagiri)
 Sivagamiammal CBSC Higher Secondary School (5 KMS from Elathagiri)
 Gonzaga College for arts and science women's college

Religious Place 

 Adaikala Madha Church, Elathagiri (Our lady of Refuge)
 Holy Family Church (Paarai Kovil)
 CSI Good Shepherd Church
 Karur Mariamman Temple
 Sri Lakshmi Narayana Temple
 St. Joseph Church, Kathampallam
 Sagayamadha Chrurch, Sagayapuram

Official Place 

 Elathagiri Post Office 
 State Bank of India, Elathagiri Branch

References

Villages in Krishnagiri district